Regal, is an electronic music producer and DJ. Regal’s sound is eclectic, best categorized as Techno or Acid Techno, but with Trance and Electro influences.  Aside from his solo career, Regal established his record label Involve Records in 2012, which has since signed artists such as Amelie Lens, Ellen Allien, Alignment, Boston 168 and Lady Starlight, to name a few.

Career
Regal was born and raised in Madrid and is of Italian descent. He shot to the forefront of the techno spectrum in 2012, after releasing productions met with widespread critical acclaim by the worldwide Techno scene. Besides a string of original releases on his Involve Records imprint, Regal has been signed to labels such as Figure, Enemy, Rekids, BPitch Control and Exhale.
The Madrid based producer has worked on collaborations with artists of the caliber of Len Faki and Amelie Lens.

Early Years
Regal’s debut release Mute EP arrived back in 2012 when he was signed to Dustin Zahn's label Enemy. Shortly after he founded his own label Involve and released its first EP Involve 01. In 2016, Figure released a collaboration between Len Faki and Regal entitled The End, marking Regal’s third release on the record label at that time. The EP created quite some noise from critics, some even jokingly naming the duo Faki Regal. This led Regal to remix renowned acts like Nina Kraviz and later, in more recent years, Ellen Allien, Emmanuel Top (one of his key early influences) and many more. While, on the other hand, Regal’s own productions have been remixed by heavyweight artists such as Mark Broom, Charlotte de Witte and Radio Slave, among others.

Recent Projects
In 2021, following plenty of EP releases on renowner labels and after having been featured on the cover of DJ Mag Spain, Regal released his debut album Remember Why You Started. The album tells the story of his personal struggles and self-discovery, giving insight into the artist's life behind the scenes. The project, an introspection of Regal’s story, caught the attention of listeners globally. The album features both tracks he started working on years ago, and some others brand new. When asked his favorite track Regal responded:

Accompanying the LP, Regal produced a short film featuring Patrick Criado, known through the Spanish Netflix series Money Heist, among the other actors. Emotional turmoil and passion resulted in powerful sounds and punchy kicks, acid lines, drum breaks and EBM- and Hip-Hop-leaning tracks, offering the listeners a glimpse into the producer's creative mind. Following the release of Remember Why You Started, three remix EPs were released, featuring reworks from artists such as Slam, Thomas P. Heckmann and Sita Abellán.

Signature Sound
Known for his ability to move between genres, his style is considered to be extensive as he draws from pockets of sounds across the electronic sphere, with tinges of Trance melodies, Electro basslines and Acid undercurrents at the centre of his ever-evolving sound.

Regal is a core resident at KHIDI, one of the key clubs at the forefront of Tbilisi’s thriving techno scene. In an interview with Mixmag, Regal expresses admiration for Tbilisi’s techno scene, describing it as solidifying peace and unity between people. Beatport’s magazine Beatportal describes KHIDI as “massive, dark and concrete — the perfect venue for Madrid DJ and producer Regal, who weaves high-octane techno, acid and electro”. The magazine When We Dip describes Regal’s sound as constantly evolving without ever losing its vibrancy and passion, while DJ Mag underlines his ferocious rhythm, with sizzling acid and raw energy, tailoring the perfect mix between strong pulse and melodies that enchant the soul. As a DJ, Regal’s dynamic and impactful style has led him to play sets across a host of renowned clubs and festivals such as Berghain, Fabrik Madrid, Tresor, Awakenings, DGTL, Exhale and many others.

Involve Records
Regal’s own label Involve Records, founded back in 2012, has become a core hub for both his solo productions and stand out collaborations with the likes of Alien Rain and Amelie Lens, whilst also welcoming artists such as Boston 168, FJAAK, Cosmin TRG, Bambounou, Z.I.P.P.O, Truncate, Alignment, Fabrizio Rat and many others to the imprint to date.

Personal Life
Born in 1989, Regal grew up and lives in Madrid. He expresses his admiration for the city in an interview with Groove: "We don't have [the] sea here, but Madrid is a beautiful city that I know well. For me it is the most beautiful city in the world. A city full of possibilities. Whatever you want to do, you can do it here."

Regal’s interest in music was always prevalent, but the serious interest in DJ-ing began in his early teen years, when he started playing around with a demo sequencer that he got with a package of cornflakes, he explains in an interview with Music Radar.

Discography

Over his career, Regal has released a considerable amount of music with a back catalogue consisting of 89 tracks, released on 22 EPs, one album and seven compilations.

Albums
 2021: Remember Why You Started (Involve)

EPs
 2022: Regal - Reworks 2.0 (Involve)
 2021: Regal - RWYS Remixes Pt.03 (Involve)
 2021: Regal - RWYS Remixes Pt.02 (Involve)
 2021: Regal - RWYS Remixes Pt.01 (Involve)
 2020: Regal - Ego Wars (Bpitch Control)
 2019: Regal - The Eyes (Bpitch Control)
 2019: Regal & Alien Rain - Acid Affair (Involve)
 2018: Regal - Still Raving (Involve)
 2018: Regal & Amelie Lens - Involve 20 (Involve)
 2018: Regal - L’Éternité (Suara)
 2017: Regal - Trave Generation (Involve)
 2017: Regal - Acid Is The Answer (Involve)
 2016: Regal - From Other Sounds (Figure)
 2016: Regal - Salie (Involve)
 2016: Regal & Len Faki - The End (Figure)
 2015: Regal - Symbol (Figure)
 2015: Regal - Alma Mater (Involve)
 2014: Regal - Chaos (Involve)
 2014: Regal - Savage (Enemy)
 2013: Regal - Involve 01 (Remixes) (Involve)
 2012: Regal - Involve 01 (Involve)
 2012: Regal - Mute (Enemy)

Compilation Appearances
 2023: Regal - Burned Out (Gemstones: Moonstone) (RAW)
 2021: Regal - True Spirit (Don’t Lose Your Smile) (DLYS)
 2020: Regal - Spreading The Cult (Exhale VA001) (Exhale)
 2020: Regal - Looking 4 Balance (EP 3) (Possession)
 2019: Regal - Nasty Boys (UFOx01) (UFO Inc.)
 2019: Regal & Alignment - Astro (Fabric Presents Amelie Lens) (Fabric)
 2017: Regal - Send Nudes (5 Years In Love With Involve) (Involve)
 2014: Regal - Report A Crash (Figure SPC R) (Figure SPC)

Remixes
 2022: UMEK - Benozal (Regal 22 Rework) (Involve)
 2022: D.O.M. - Acid War (Regal 22 Rework) (Involve)
 2022: AIROD - The Last Of Us (Regal Remix) (Elixyr)
 2021: Regal - Cult Of Personality (Regal & Sita Abellan Remix) (Involve)
 2021: Sept - Sensation Seeker (Regal Remix) (Voxnox)
 2021: Fabrizio Rat - Rave Runner (Regal Remix) (Involve)
 2021: Marco Bailey - Scorpia (New Legacy Regal Remix) (Suara)
 2020: Crossfaith - Endorphin (Regal Spitfire Remix) (Species Inc.)
 2019: Ellen Allien - Electronic Joy (Regal XTC Remix) (Bpitch Control)
 2019: Alignment - Interference (Regal Remix) (Etruria Beat)
 2019: PØLI & Lorenzo Raganzini - No Escape (Regal Remix) (HEX)
 2018: Amelie Lens - Render (Regal Remix) (Involve)
 2018: Rocko Garoni - Detection (Regal Remix) (Second State)
 2018: Emmanuel Top - This Is Cocaine (Regal Remix) (Filth On Acid)
 2017: Giorgia Angiuli - Over The Clouds (Regal Remix) (Suara)
 2016: Andre Kronert - Ain't No Funny Music (Regal Warehouse Remix) (Odd Even)
 2016: Andre Kronert - Dirty Old Man (Regal Remix) (Odd Even)
 2015: Marco Faraone - Black Air (Regal Remix) (On Edge Society)
 2015: Nina Kraviz - Ghetto Kraviz (Regal 'Sad' Remix) (Rekids)
 2015: Nina Kraviz - Ghetto Kraviz (Regal 303 Dub) (Rekids)
 2015: Nina Kraviz - Ghetto Kraviz (Regal 303 Remix) (Rekids)

References

External links
 
 Involve Records

Living people
Musicians from Madrid
Spanish record producers
Spanish DJs
Spanish people of Italian descent